Thomas Jefferson Wertenbaker (February 6, 1879 – April 22, 1966) was a leading American historian and Edwards Professor of American History at Princeton University.  Born in Charlottesville, Virginia, he received his bachelor's and doctoral degrees from the University of Virginia, gaining a reputation for his doctoral dissertation, Patrician and Plebeian in Virginia (1910), followed by Virginia Under the Stuarts (1914), and his master work, The Planters of Colonial Virginia (1922).

In 1910, Princeton President Woodrow Wilson brought him there as a preceptor. Wertenbaker was a member of the history department for 37 years and its chairman from 1928 to 1936.  He was an effective and popular undergraduate teacher, and also carried the majority of the burden of graduate teaching for many years.

He was president of the American Historical Association in 1947, a member of the American Philosophical Society, Harold Vyvyan Harmsworth Professor of American History at the University of Oxford in 1939–1940 and 1944–1945, and visiting professor at the University of Göttingen and the University of Munich. He was also a newspaper editor and an amateur architect.

He was buried at the University of Virginia Cemetery in Charlottesville, Virginia.

Selected works
Patrician and Plebeian in Virginia; Or The Origin and Development of the Social Classes of the Old Dominion (doctoral thesis) (1910) online edition
Virginia Under the Stuarts, 1607–1688 (Princeton University Press, 1914) online edition
The Planters of Colonial Virginia (Princeton University Press, 1922) online edition
The Founding of American Civilization: The Middle Colonies (1938) online edition
Torchbearer of the Revolution: The Story of Bacon's Rebellion and Its Leader (1940) short review
The Old South: The Founding of American Civilization (1942) review
The Puritan Oligarchy: The Founding of American Civilization (1947)
The Molding of the American West (1947) (address to the American Historical Association) online edition
 Bacon's Rebellion, 1676 (1957) online edition
Give Me Liberty: The Struggle for Self-Government in Virginia (1958) online edition

References

External links
 
 
 Bacon's Rebellion at manybooks.net

1879 births
1966 deaths
University of Virginia alumni
Writers from Charlottesville, Virginia
Princeton University faculty
Presidents of the American Historical Association
Harold Vyvyan Harmsworth Professors of American History
Members of the American Philosophical Society
Burials at the University of Virginia Cemetery
Historians from Virginia